Ratan Lal (born 1 January 1924) was an Indian politician. He was elected to the Lok Sabha, the lower house of the Parliament of India, from Banswara in Rajasthan, as a member of the Indian National Congress.

References

External links
Official biographical sketch in Parliament of India website

1924 births
Possibly living people
India MPs 1962–1967
Lok Sabha members from Rajasthan